Windows is an album by American jazz guitarist O'Donel Levy recorded in 1976 and released on the Groove Merchant label.

Reception 

Allmusic's Jason Ankeny said: "Following on the heels of George Benson's crossover blockbuster Breezin', Windows casts O'Donel Levy in the same mainstream, fusion-inspired mold, complete with vocals. To Levy's credit, the album never feels like a sell-out bid, and if anything, the mellow context underscores the chromatic beauty of his singular guitar aesthetic. With its bold, lush arrangements, the album at times boasts a cinematic splendor calling to mind the blaxploitation sound. Inasmuch as funk is ever subtle, Windows is ripe with nuance and resonance, yet never falls prey to the sleepiness of smooth jazz".

Track listing
All compositions by O'Donel Levy
 "Panama Red" – 6:34
 "I Believe in Miracles" – 5:45
 "Freedom and Good Times" – 5:28
 "I'll Sing from My Window" – 5:36
 "Moisturizer" – 6:22
 "Green Machine" – 5:14

Personnel
O'Donel Levy – guitar
Aleta Greene – vocals
Stafford Levy – drums
Gary Grainger – bass
David E.Smith – saxophone, flute
Jimmy Wilson – trumpet
Charles Covington – piano, synthesizer
Jimmy Maelen – percussion
Horn section and string section arranged and conducted by Brad Baker
Lew Delgatto, George Young – saxophone, flute
Lew Soloff, Randy Brecker – trumpet
Barry Rogers, Joe Randazzo – trombone
Tony Posk, Guy Lumia, Norman Carr, Frederick Buldrini, Harold Kohan, Richard Sortomme, Julian Barker, Richard Maximoff, Jesse Levy, Richard Locker – strings

References

Groove Merchant albums
O'Donel Levy albums
1976 albums
Albums produced by Sonny Lester